Prince Emanuel of Liechtenstein (Emanuel Joseph Johann; 2 February/3 February 1700, in Vienna – 15 January 1771, in Vienna) was the father and brother to two of Liechtenstein's monarchs.

Early life 
Emanuel was the second son of Prince Philipp Erasmus of Liechtenstein (11 September 1664 – 13 January 1704) and Countess Christina Theresa von Löwenstein-Wertheim-Rochefort (12 October 1665 – 14 April 1730). He was brother to Josef Wenzel, Prince of Liechtenstein.

In 1749 he became the 734th Knight of the Order of the Golden Fleece.

Personal life 
He married Countess Maria Anna Antonia von Dietrichstein-Weichselstädt (Graz, 10 September 1706 - Vienna, 7 January 1777) on 14 January 1726 in Vienna. They had thirteen children. Their eldest son became monarch of Liechtenstein when Emanuel's brother died without any surviving heirs.
Franz Joseph I, Prince of Liechtenstein (1726–1781), married Countess Maria Leopoldine of Sternberg and had issue
Prince Karl Borromäus of Liechtenstein (1730–1789), married Princess Maria Eleonore of Oettingen-Spielberg and had issue
Prince Philipp Joseph Franz Maria (Vienna, 8 September 1731 - k.i.a. in Prague, 6 May 1757), unmarried and without issue
Prince Emanuel Joseph Bartholomäus Antonius (Vienna, 24 August 1732 - Vienna, 20 December 1738)
Prince Johann Joseph Simplicius (Vienna, 2 March 1734 - Vienna, 18 February 1781), unmarried and without issue
Prince Anton Joseph Johannes Achatius (Vienna, 22 June 1735 - Vienna, 6 May 1737)
Prince Joseph Wenzel Ladislaus (Vienna, 28 June 1736 - Vienna, 20 March 1739)
Princess Maria Amalia Susanna (Vienna, 11 August 1737 - Milan, 20 October 1787), married in Vienna on 25 February 1754 as his first wife Johannes Siegmund Friedrich 2te Fürst von Khevenhüller-Metsch (Vienna, 23 February 1732 - Klagenfurt, 15 June 1801), and had issue
Princess Maria Anna Theresia (Vienna, 15 October 1738 - Vienna, 29 May 1814), married in Mährisch-Kromau on 23 May 1754 Emanuel Philibert Graf von Waldstein-Wartenberg (Vienna, 2 February 1731 - Trebitsch, 22 May 1775), and has issue
Princess Franziska Xaveria Maria (Vienna, 27 November 1739 - Vienna, 17 May 1821), married in Feldsberg on 6 August 1755 Charles-Joseph, 7th Prince of Ligne, and had issue
Princess Maria Christina Anna (Vienna, 1 September 1741 - Vienna, 30 April 1819), married in Vienna on 18 May 1761 Franz Ferdinand Graf Kinsky von Wchinitz und Tettau (Vienna, 8 December 1738 – 7 April 1806), and had issue
Princess Maria Theresia Anna (Vienna, 1 September 1741 - Vienna, 30 June 1766), married in Vienna on 24 April 1763 Karl Joseph Hieronymus (Károly József Jeromos) Graf Pálffy ab Erdöd, Chancellor of Hungary (1735–1816) (Vienna, 1 October 1735 - Vienna, 25 May 1816), and had issue
Prince Josef Leopold Sebastian Emanuel (Vienna, 21 January 1743 - Gaya, India, 31 December 1771), unmarried and without issue

Ancestry

References

18th-century Austrian people
Princes of Liechtenstein
Knights of the Golden Fleece of Austria
Nobility from Vienna
1700 births
1771 deaths